The Lou Richards Medal is an annual Most Valuable Player award for the Australian Football League, based on votes from the Sunday Footy Show panel each week.

History
The Lou Richards Medal is named after former Collingwood player, Lou Richards. It was named in his honour due to his involvement in football, both onfield and in the media.

Voting
For each game during the home and away season, one Sunday Footy Show panelist will review the game and award votes to the best four players. These four players receive any number of votes up to ten based on the quality of their performance. Seven or eight are the most common scores given; ten votes, representing a flawless performance, is extremely rare.

List of winners

References

Collingwood Football Club
Australian Football League awards
2000 establishments in Australia